Rawlinna is an isolated locality on the Trans-Australian Railway in Western Australia, about  east of Perth and  west of the Western Australia / South Australia border. Maximum daytime temperatures are typically  through summer and  during winter. In 2016, the population in the area was recorded as 30 people.

Australia’s largest operating sheep station, Rawlinna Station, covering an area of  – about the area of the Sydney conurbation – adjoins the railway line. It runs up to 65,000 Merino sheep in a good season. Mustering and droving is done on motorbikes and in aircraft to locate them, beginning in January for a 10-week shearing program.

Visitors come from far and wide each year to the popular gymkhana known as the "Nullarbor Muster", which benefits a number of charities.

Trans-Australian Railway
Rawlinna is a stop for the Indian Pacific, the experiential tourism train that operates between Perth and Sydney.

The train is the successor to the Trans-Australian, which was inaugurated in 1917, when the line was opened. Before 1951, when diesel locomotives were introduced, steam locomotives required frequent servicing because of poor water quality; Rawlinna was one of four major stations that had workshops and facilities such as a food store and bakery operated by the Commonwealth Railways, and a school. However, all Commonwealth Railways operational buildings have been demolished; about a dozen buildings remain.

References

External links

Towns in Western Australia
Goldfields-Esperance
Trans-Australian Railway